Traian Georgescu (20 March 1931 – 15 May 2008) was a Romanian football defender who spent his entire career at Universitatea Cluj. He was "U" Cluj's captain when the club won the 1964–65 Cupa României.

Georgescu also worked as a surgeon and when his team colleague Remus Câmpeanu was diagnosed with appendicitis, Georgescu was the one who operated him at Câmpeanu's request. He died in 2008 a few years after being diagnosed with Alzheimer's disease.

Honours
Universitatea Cluj
Divizia B: 1957–58
Cupa României: 1964–65

References

External links
Traian Georgescu at Labtof.ro

1931 births
2008 deaths
Romanian footballers
Association football defenders
Liga I players
Liga II players
FC Universitatea Cluj players
Romanian surgeons
20th-century surgeons
Sportspeople from Ploiești
Deaths from dementia in Romania
Deaths from Alzheimer's disease